Andrzej Papierz (born 21 November 1966, in Frampol) is a Polish journalist and diplomat. He is the former Ambassador of Poland to Bulgaria (2007–2010), the Undersecretary of State at the Ministry of Foreign Affairs (2018), and the Director General of the Foreign Service (2018–2021).

Life 

Papierz holds M.A. in history from the University of Warsaw, he defended his thesis in 1999. During his studies, he was a board member of the Independent Students’ Association. He was also active in underground Solidarity. He was several times detained for political reasons. He was co-founder and one of the leaders of the Republican League.

In 1990, Papierz became journalist at the Tygodnik Solidarność weekly. Between 1991 and 1993, he was working for the Office for State Protection, being responsible for analysing political situation in the states of then collapsing Soviet Union. In 1993, he returned to journalism. Following work for the Polish Radio, he worked for Polsat TV, Telewizja Polska, Życie daily, RTL 7 TV. He was foreign corresponding in the Caucasus region. In 1998, he joined the Chancellery of the Prime Minister, becoming the Deputy Director, and then Director of Government Information Centre.

From 2001 to 2006, he held the position of the Director of Polish Institute in Sofia. Afterwards, he was the Director of the Human Resources and Training Department at the MFA. In 2007, he was nominated ambassador to Bulgaria, ending his term in 2010. Later, he was serving at the Embassy in Kabul, Afghanistan, and as a Senior Advisor to commanders of the ISAF’s Polish Military Contingent in Ghazni Province. Next, for a couple of months he was posted in Belgrade. From 2013 to 2016, he was Consul-General in Almaty, being in charge of majority of Kazakhstan and whole Kyrgyzstan. For next two years, he was on the same position in Istanbul, Turkey (2017–2018). From April to October 2018 he was the Undersecretary of State at the MFA covering Polish Community Abroad, and Public Diplomacy issues. From 22 October 2018 to 13 April 2021 Papierz was the Director General of the Foreign Service.

Married to Krystyna, with five children. Beside Polish, he speaks Bulgarian, Russian, and English languages. He has also passive knowledge of Serbian and Macedonian.

Honours 

 Decoration of Honor Meritorious for Polish Culture (2000)
 Medal of Merit for National Defence (2011)
 Afghanistan Star Medal (2012)
 Afghanistan Campaign Medal (2012)
 Cross of Freedom and Solidarity (2015)
 Pro Patria Medal (2016)
Officer's Cross of the Order of Polonia Restituta (2019)
Medal of the Centenary of Regained Independence (2021)

References 

1966 births
Ambassadors of Poland to Bulgaria
Consuls-General of Poland
Living people
Officers of the Order of Polonia Restituta
Polish dissidents
Polish journalists
Recipients of the Medal of Merit for National Defence
Solidarity (Polish trade union) activists
University of Warsaw alumni
Recipients of the Pro Patria Medal
Recipients of the Medal of the Centenary of Regained Independence